Timothy John Bothwell (born May 6, 1955, in Vancouver, British Columbia) is a retired professional ice hockey defenseman who played 502 games in the National Hockey League. He played for the New York Rangers, St. Louis Blues, and Hartford Whalers, and several AHL teams. Before his professional career, he played at Brown, where he was a three-time all-Ivy League defenseman, member of the Bruins' 1975-76 NCAA semi-finalists, and captain of the team the next two seasons. Tim was inducted into the Brown University Athletic Hall of Fame in 1984. He retired from playing hockey in 1990.

Coaching career
After his time as a player he became an assistant and coach. His first experiences were with male hockey, leading the Western Hockey League’s Medicine Hat Tigers (1990-92), the International Hockey League’s Phoenix Roadrunners (1992-94) and the University of Calgary men’s team (1994-2001). Bothwell was an assistant coach with the NHL's Atlanta Thrashers from 2001 to 2003, and then decided to try women's hockey. In 2004, he was an assistant coach with the Calgary Oval X-Treme. He was assistant on the Canadian Women’s Olympic Team that won the gold medal at the 2006 Winter Olympics. He served as the University of Vermont women's ice hockey coach from 2006-2012. In 2013, Bothwell became coach for the CWHL's Calgary Inferno. Tim is currently the head coach of the 2014-15 Midget AAA boys team at Edge School For Athletes in Calgary, Alberta, Canada

Personal life
Bothwell is the son of the late John Bothwell, the eighth bishop of the Diocese of Niagara.

Career statistics

Regular season and playoffs

Awards and honors

References

External links

1955 births
Living people
Atlanta Thrashers coaches
Brown Bears men's ice hockey players
Canadian ice hockey coaches
Canadian ice hockey defencemen
Hartford Whalers players
Medicine Hat Tigers coaches
Montana Magic players
New Haven Nighthawks players
New York Rangers players
Peoria Rivermen (IHL) players
St. Louis Blues players
Ice hockey people from Vancouver
Springfield Indians players
Undrafted National Hockey League players
Vermont Catamounts women's ice hockey coaches